Newark–Heath Airport  is a public airport located in Heath, Ohio. The airport was opened in 1930 by the city of Newark, and was transferred to the Licking County Regional Airport Authority in 1967. The airport currently has a McDonnell Douglas F-4C Phantom II S.N. 64–0683 on static display.

Although most U.S. airports use the same three-letter location identifier for the FAA and IATA, Newark–Heath Airport is assigned VTA by the FAA but has no designation from the IATA.

Facilities and aircraft 
Newark–Heath Airports FBO (Aviation Works) is owned by George H. Fackler III. Aviation Works offers hangar rental, aircraft rental, aircraft training, and a maintenance shop led by Jeff Furay. Aviation Works also offers full service refueling with Jet-A, and 100LL fuel. Their operating hours are normally 0800-2000 EST.

References

External links 

Airports in Ohio
Buildings and structures in Licking County, Ohio
Transportation in Licking County, Ohio